Star One C2 is a Brazilian communications satellite. It was launched on 18 April 2008 22:17 UTC by an Ariane 5ECA carrier rocket, as part of a dual-payload launch with Vinasat-1. It was built by Thales Alenia Space, based on the Spacebus-3000B3 satellite bus. It is operated by Star One, a subsidiary of Embratel, and Bolivarsat.

Overview
On June 2, 2008, Star One C2 replaced BrasilSat B4 in the task of broadcasting the main Brazilian TV network channels. This position, at 70.0° W, had been once occupied by Brasilsat B1.

Since December 2008, Star One C2 transmits the Claro TV pay TV package. The service is supplied by Embratel and Claro companies and operates in Ku band.

See also
 Star One (satellite operator)
 Star One C1
 Star One C3

References

External links
 Satellite fact sheet 
 Star One C2 at LyngSat
 Via Embratel package at LyngSat
 
 Star One C2 coverage maps as files.
 Star One C2 coverage maps on Google Maps.
 Star One C2 realtime tracking.

Communications satellites in geosynchronous orbit
Spacecraft launched in 2008
Satellites using the Spacebus bus
Star One satellites